Jennifer Natalya Fink (born Washington, D.C.) is an American author working in experimental feminist and queer fiction. She is best known for her novels Burn, V, and The Mikvah Queen, which was nominated for the Pulitzer Prize in 2010. Her novel, Bhopal Dance (2018), won the FC2 Catherine Doctorow Innovative Fiction Prize in 2017.

Life
Fink holds a Ph.D in Performance Studies from New York University and an MFA in Performance from the School at the Art Institute of Chicago.

She teaches creative writing at Georgetown University.

She is also the founder and director of The Gorilla Press, a non-profit organization that promotes children’s literacy through bookmaking workshops.
 
In 2009, she was the US judge for the Caine Prize for African Literature.

Awards
Won

 FC2's Catherine Doctorow Innovative Fiction Prize,  Winner for Bhopal Dance, 2017
 Billy Heekin Arts Award, Winner for Out on Fire, Stonewall Foundation, 2002
 Dana Award, Winner for The Mikvah Queen, 1997.
 Georgetown Review Fiction Award, Winner for “World Records,” 1996
 Writer’s Digest Fiction Award, Second Place Winner for “Vertebrae,” 1996
Story Magazine Naked Fiction Contest, Second Place Winner for “Spit Bugs,” 1996
 Story Magazine Short Short Fiction Contest, Second Place Winner for “Slipping,” 1996

Finalist/Nominations

 The Clarissa Dalloway Fiction Prize, A Room of Her Own Foundation, Finalist for Bhopal Dance, 2015
 The FC2 Catherine Doctorow Innovative Fiction Prize, Finalist for Bhopal Dance, 2015
 The FC2 Ronald Sukenick Innovative Fiction Prize, Finalist for Bhopal Dance, 2015
 The Willow Books Literature Award, Shortlisted for Bhopal Dance, 2015
 The Pen/Faulkner Award, Nomination for Thirteen Fugues, 2011
 The Pulitzer Prize, Nomination for The Mikvah Queen, 2010
 Amazon Breakthrough Novel Award, Semi-finalist for The Mikvah Queen, 2010
 Glimmer Train Short Fiction Award, Finalist for “Fabrications,” 2007
 The National Book Award, Nominated for V, 2006
 The National Jewish Book Award, Nominated for V, 2006 
 The National Jewish Book Award, Nominated for Burn, 2003
 two girls review Experimental Novel Award, Finalist for manuscript of Thirteen Fugues, 1998

Works
Fiction

 

Criticism

References

External links
 Story at 580 Split
 Official Website

21st-century American novelists
Living people
Georgetown University faculty
American women novelists
21st-century American women writers
American LGBT writers
Year of birth missing (living people)
American women academics